Strangers is a novel written by Dean Koontz, released in 1986.

Plot 
A group of people are brought together by their different and equally strange maladies. There is Dominick who suffers from somnambulism, Ginger has unexplained lapses into a fugue state, Father Brendan loses his faith and later gains a miraculous 'gift', and Ernie who suffers from nyctophobia.

Dominick receives Polaroids that lead him to the Tranquility Motel, situated in the middle of the Nevada 'high-desert', thirty miles west of Elko. Together with Ned and Sandy, who run the restaurant next door to the motel, they discover that their true memories from the summer of the previous year may have been suppressed.

Later Ginger, Jorja, and the other people who stayed at the Tranquility Motel are contacted and invited to join the group. Ginger shares that their memories are suppressed by Azrael Blocks - a means of brainwashing induced through drugs and hypnosis. She received hypnosis as a treatment to uncover a cause of her malady.

The Tranquility 'community' are unaware that those behind the suppression are watching them. They are joined by Jack Twist (who was led to the Tranquility Motel by a series of postcards placed there by an insider). The group finally comes up with a strategy to uncover the government secret that has been hidden at the Thunder Hill Depository in the hills.

Primary characters
Dominick Corvaisis, author
Ginger Weiss, surgeon
Ernie Block, U.S.M.C. (ret.), and his wife, Faye Block
Brendan Cronin, priest and curate
Jack Twist, former Army Ranger and P.O.W., professional thief
Jorja Monatella, formerly Rykoff, Las Vegas casino cocktail waitress
Alan Rykoff, Jorja's estranged husband
Marcie Rykoff, their young daughter
Sandy Sarver, diner waitress, and her husband, Ned Sarver, short-order cook
Leland Falkirk, U.S. Army Colonel 
Parker Faine, artist
Stefan Wycazik, parish priest

Nominations 

World Fantasy Award Nominee for Best Novel (1987)
British Fantasy Award Nominee for Best Novel (1987)

Adaptation
In 2018, it was announced that an adaptation of Strangers is in development at Fox for a one hour drama created by Criminal Minds creator Jeff Davis. The project is a co-production between Fox and Sony Pictures Television.

References

External links
Strangers Book Review

American horror novels
1986 American novels
Novels by Dean Koontz
Novels set in Nevada